Chang Fu-hsing (21 July 1942 – 18 May 2003) was a Taiwanese politician who served as a member of the Legislative Yuan from 1999 to 2001 and as Hualien County magistrate from 2001 until his death in 2003.

Education
Chang attended schools in his native Hualien before earning a bachelor's degree in law from Soochow University. He then furthered his legal education at Kinki University in Japan.

Political career
Chang served in the Legislative Yuan from 1999 to 2001 when he was elected Hualien County magistrate with 59,591 votes in the local elections. He was a cofounder of the Taroko Gorge Marathon, which started in 2000.

Death and succession
Chang died of lung cancer on 18 May 2003 at Taipei Veterans General Hospital. He was married to Liu Chao-a (劉詔娥) until his death. Liu attempted to capture the Kuomintang nomination for her husband's position, but later mounted an independent election bid supported by the Democratic Progressive Party to succeed her husband in the early stages of a four-way race. She won neither party's endorsement and later dropped out of the race. Chang was succeeded by Hsieh Shen-shan, who won 73,710 votes in the by-election following Chang's death.

References

1942 births
2003 deaths
Deaths from lung cancer
Deaths from cancer in Taiwan
Members of the 4th Legislative Yuan
Politicians of the Republic of China on Taiwan from Hualien County
Kuomintang Members of the Legislative Yuan in Taiwan
Soochow University (Taiwan) alumni
Kindai University alumni
Magistrates of Hualien County